Vannes may refer to:

Places
 Vannes, Vannes, Morbihan, Brittany, France; a commune and city
 Vannes station, a rail station in Vannes
 Vannes Airfield (IATA airport code: VNE, ICAO airport code: LFRV), Golfe du Morbihan, France
 Golfe du Morbihan - Vannes Agglomération, the Vannes metropolitan area
 Roman Catholic Diocese of Vannes, Vannes, Morbihan, Brittany, France
 Vannes Cathedral, Vannes, Morbihan, Brittany, France
 Arrondissement of Vannes, Morbihan, Brittany, France; an arrondissement containing Vannes
 Canton of Vannes-1, Morbihan, Brittany, France; a commune containing Vannes
 Canton of Vannes-2, Morbihan, Brittany, France
 Canton of Vannes-3, Morbihan, Brittany, France
 Vannes-le-Châtel (Vannes Castle), Meurthe-et-Moselle, France; a commune
 Vannes-sur-Cosson (Vannes-upon-Cosson), Loiret, France; a commune

People
 Count of Vannes, a title for an influential ruler in Brittany, based in what is now Vannes, Morbihan, France
 Peter Vannes (died 1563) Italian Catholic churchman
 René Vannes (1888–1956) Belgian musicologist

Sports
 Vannes OC, a soccer team based in Vannes, Morbihan, France
 Rugby Club Vannes, a rugby union team based in Vannes, Morbihan, France
 Auray-Vannes Half Marathon through Vannes, Morbihan, France

Other uses
 Sieges of Vannes (1342), four sieges between John of Montfort and Charles of Blois

See also

 Vennes
 Vanes Martirosyan (born 1986) Armenian-American pro-wrestler
 Vanness Wu (born 1978) Taiwanese-American actor
 Carol Vaness (born 1952) American soprano
 van Nes (surname)
 
 Vanne (disambiguation)
 Van Ness (disambiguation)
 Vans (disambiguation)